Winter Enclosure, the debut album by Norwegian gothic metal band Octavia Sperati was released on 14 June 2005 on the Candlelight Records label.

The album was promoted with two music videos: "Lifelines of Depths" (in a second version of the already known in 2004) and "Hunting Eye", both made by the director Asle Birkeland.

Track listing

Personnel

Octavia Sperati 
Silje Wergeland – vocals
Bodil Myklebust – guitar
Gyri S. Losnegaard – guitar
Trine C. Johansen – bass
Tone Midtgaard – keyboard
Hege S. Larson – drums

Additional musicians 
 Pytten (Eirik Hundvin) - grand piano
 Ivar Bjørnson - effects in track 11

Production and Engineering 
Produced, recorded  mixed By – Herbrand Larsen
Engineer – Eirik "Pytten" Hundvin, Arve "Squanky" Isdal
Layout – Adrian Wear
Mastered By – Tim Turan
Hair & Styling – Jeanette Myrvoll, Veronika Kindervåg
Make Up – Tina Solberg Torstad
Photography – Chris McFall
Photography By [Front Image] – Evil Twin (10), Gregory J. Summers
Recorded At – Earshot Studio
Recorded At – Grieghallen Studio and Earshot Studio, Bergen
Produced At – Earshot Studio
Mastered At – Turan Audio
Cover image: Sunshine on a Cloudy Day ©2000 by Gregory J. Summers.

References

External links 
Discogs.com
Metallum Archives

2005 debut albums
Octavia Sperati albums
Candlelight Records albums